Don't Know Why is a song written by Jesse Harris and popularized by Norah Jones

Don't Know Why may also refer to:

Albums
 Don't Know Why, a 2003 album by Harold Mabern
 Don't Know Why, a 1998 album by Trish Thuy Trang

Songs
 "I Don't Know Why", the first song on Evolve by Imagine Dragons
 "Don't Know Why" (SoundGirl song)
 "Don't Know Why", a song by Saves the Day
 "I Don't Know Why", a 1968 song by Stevie Wonder